Bruno Ballarini (18 April 1937 – 17 January 2015) was an Italian football defender.

Born in Milan, in 1958 Ballarini moved from U.S. Rovereto, where he played as a midfielder, to Calcio Como, where the coach of the time  Hugo Lamanna instead employed him in the role of defender. He played in the Como team twelve consecutive championships, seven in Serie B and five in Serie C, becoming the captain of the team.  He holds the record for championship appearances in Calcio Como with 350 matches.

At the end of his career Ballarini was player-coach of FC Chiasso in the Swiss Challenge League championship in 1971-1972.

References

1937 births
2015 deaths
Italian footballers
Association football defenders
Serie B players
FC Chiasso players
Como 1907 players
Italian expatriate footballers
Expatriate footballers in Switzerland
Italian expatriate sportspeople in Switzerland
Italian football managers
FC Chiasso managers
Italian expatriate football managers
Expatriate football managers in Switzerland